Baohe District is one of four urban districts of the prefecture-level city of Hefei, the capital of Anhui Province, East China, located on the northwest shore of Lake Chao. It governs 7 subdistricts and 2 towns.

Administrative divisions
Baohe District is divided to 6 subdistricts and 2 towns.

Subdistricts

Towns
Feihe
Daxu

References

Hefei